David or Dave Howard may refer to:

Entertainment
 David Howard (director) (1896–1941), American film director
 David Howard (photographer artist) (born 1952), experimental photographer

Sports
 Dave Howard (second baseman) (1889–1956), played for Washington Senators, Tip-Tops
 David Howard (sailor) (1918–2023), Canadian Olympic sailor
 David Howard (linebacker) (born 1961), former American football linebacker
 David Howard (baseball) (born 1967), professional baseball player
 David Howard (defensive tackle) (born 1987), American football defensive tackle

Other
 David Howard (poet) (born 1959), New Zealand poet and editor
 David Howard (ballet teacher) (1937–2013), British-American ballet instructor
 David Howard (Montana politician) (born 1946), Republican member of the Montana Legislature
 David Sanctuary Howard (1928–2005), expert on Chinese armorial porcelain